The Métropole du Grand Paris ("Metropolis of Greater Paris"), also known as Grand Paris or Greater Paris, is a métropole covering the City of Paris and its nearest surrounding suburbs. 

The métropole came into existence on 1 January 2016; it comprises 131 communes, including Paris and all 123 communes in the surrounding inner-suburban departments of the Petite Couronne (Hauts-de-Seine, Seine-Saint-Denis and Val-de-Marne), plus seven communes in two of the outer-suburban departments, including the communes of Argenteuil in Val-d'Oise, Savigny-sur-Orge, Juvisy-sur-Orge, Viry-Châtillon and Paray-Vieille-Poste in Essonne, the last of which covers part of Orly Airport. Part of the métropole comprises the Seine department, which existed from 1929 to 1968. 

Grand Paris covers 814 square kilometers (314 square miles), about the size of Singapore, and has a population of over 7 million. The métropole is administered by a metropolitan council of 210 members, not directly elected, but chosen by the councils of the member communes. Its responsibilities include urban planning, housing, as well as environment protection. The Métropole du Grand Paris should not be confused with the Grand Paris Express, a new transportation system being developed independently to connect the departments in the Paris suburbs.

History
The idea of Greater Paris was originally proposed by French President Nicolas Sarkozy as "a new global plan for the Paris metropolitan region" It first led to a new transportation master plan for the Paris region and to plans to develop several areas around Paris. The "Métropole du Grand Paris" was defined by the law of 27 January 2014 on the modernization of public territorial action and affirmation of cities as part of Act III of decentralization. The plans were considerably modified in December 2015, and the passage into action in two competences, economic development and protection of the environment was delayed from 2016 to 2017.

The plan was first announced on 17 September 2007 during the inauguration of "La Cité de l'architecture et du patrimoine", when Sarkozy declared his intent to create a "new comprehensive development project for Greater Paris". The project was organized by the French state, with the Minister of Culture and Communication charged with coordinating the consultation process.

In 2008 an international urban and architectural competition for the future development of metropolitan Paris was launched. Ten teams gathering architects, urban planners, geographers, landscape architects will offer their vision for building a Paris metropolis of the 21st century in the post-Kyoto era and make a prospective diagnosis for Paris and its suburbs that will define future developments in Greater Paris for the next 40 years.

The architects leading the ten multi-disciplinary teams were: Jean Nouvel, Christian de Portzamparc, Antoine Grumbach, Roland Castro, Yves Lion, Djamel Klouche, Richard Rogers, Bernardo Secchi, Paola Viganò, Finn Geipel, Giulia Andi, and Winy Maas.

Early versions of the plan proposed reforms to the local government structure of the Paris region by creating an integrated urban community encompassing the City of Paris and the surrounding Petite Couronne, However, these were largely abandoned due to strong opposition from the socialist Mayor of Paris, Bertrand Delanoë, and the socialist head of the Île de France region, Jean-Paul Huchon.

Objectives

The original plan for the Métropole declared these objectives: "The Métropole of Grand Paris is established in order to define and implement metropolitan action to improve the quality of life of its residents, reduce inequalities between regions within it, to develop an urban, social and economic sustainability model, tools to improve attractiveness and competitiveness for the benefit of the entire national territory. The Métropole of Grand Paris is developing a metropolitan project. The residents are associated with its development according to the guidelines determined by the metropolitan council as laid down by the development council.
This metropolitan project defines the general guidelines of the policy pursued by the Métropole of Grand Paris. It forms part of the implementation of the overall scheme of the Ile-de-France region. It includes a general, social, economic and environmental analysis of the metropolitan area, the strategic guidelines for the development of the metropolis as well as priority areas for intervention. The Metro project can be developed with the support of the Land and Technical Agency of the Paris Region, the International Workshop on Greater Paris, the Urban Planning Agencies and any other useful body."

Transportation

Independently to the process described above, a position of Minister for Le Grand Paris was created and Christian Blanc was appointed to occupy it. Blanc and his team prepared a transportation plan, announced on April 29, 2009. The Île-de-France region had already published its own transportation plan. Later, the architects of the consultation joined together to present a third transportation plan. After much negotiation, a compromise between the national government and the Île-de-France regional government was announced in January 2011 and the final plan subsequently approved.

The transport plan will be carried out in ten years, at a cost of 35 billion euros funded by the state, local governments and new debt. An important part of the project is a driverless subway linking important business and residential poles such as Versailles and the Charles de Gaulle airport but also banlieues like Montfermeil and Clichy-sous-Bois through a figure-eight track 140 km long and operating 24-hour, which will alone cost 21 billion euros. Another 14 billion euros will be spent in the extension and re-equipment of existing metro, regional and suburban lines.

Criticism
The way Le Grand Paris has been handled was criticized by the architects themselves, especially by Jean Nouvel who wrote several virulent editorials against the Minister in charge of Le Grand Paris until June 2010, Christian Blanc.

Politically, the President of the Île-de-France region, Jean-Paul Huchon, and the Mayor of Paris, Bertrand Delanoë, both members of the French Socialist Party, opposed the initiatives taken by the national government, which they said were against the devolution of urban planning matters to local governments. In October 2011, Delanoë stated that the President "is trying to claim for himself an urban dynamic begun long ago by the local governments". Although Huchon had reached an agreement with the national government earlier in the year on the transportation network, he also declared that Grand Paris "is not a generic term to cover everything that is going on on the territory of the Île-de-France region (...) and even less a national certificate created to relabel local policies that were already in existence." Political opposition was also strong from the Green Party, led in the Île-de-France region by Cécile Duflot.

Établissements Publics Territoriaux of the Grand Paris 

The 131 communes of the Métropole du Grand Paris are grouped in 12 'établissements publics territoriaux (EPT) or territoires, which replaced the existing inter-communal public institutions and inherited their competences such as sport and socio-cultural amenities, water supply, sanitation, waste management and some urban and social policies.

{{Legend|#6887B3|T1 – City of Paris (not an établissement public territorial' since there is only one commune)}}

Communes
The Métropole du Grand Paris consists of the following 131 communes:

Ablon-sur-Seine
Alfortville
Antony
Arcueil
Argenteuil
Asnières-sur-Seine
Athis-Mons
Aubervilliers
Aulnay-sous-Bois
Bagneux
Bagnolet
Le Blanc-Mesnil
Bobigny
Bois-Colombes
Boissy-Saint-Léger
Bondy
Bonneuil-sur-Marne
Boulogne-Billancourt
Le Bourget
Bourg-la-Reine
Bry-sur-Marne
Cachan
Champigny-sur-Marne
Charenton-le-Pont
Châtenay-Malabry
Châtillon
Chaville
Chennevières-sur-Marne
Chevilly-Larue
Choisy-le-Roi
Clamart
Clichy
Clichy-sous-Bois
Colombes
Coubron
Courbevoie
La Courneuve
Créteil
Drancy
Dugny
Épinay-sur-Seine
Fontenay-aux-Roses
Fontenay-sous-Bois
Fresnes
Gagny
Garches
La Garenne-Colombes
Gennevilliers
Gentilly
Gournay-sur-Marne
L'Haÿ-les-Roses
L'Île-Saint-Denis
Issy-les-Moulineaux
Ivry-sur-Seine
Joinville-le-Pont
Juvisy-sur-Orge
Le Kremlin-Bicêtre
Les Lilas
Levallois-Perret
Limeil-Brévannes
Livry-Gargan
Maisons-Alfort
Malakoff
Mandres-les-Roses
Marnes-la-Coquette
Marolles-en-Brie
Meudon
Montfermeil
Montreuil
Montrouge
Morangis
Nanterre
Neuilly-Plaisance
Neuilly-sur-Marne
Neuilly-sur-Seine
Nogent-sur-Marne
Noiseau
Noisy-le-Grand
Noisy-le-Sec
Orly
Ormesson-sur-Marne
Pantin
Paray-Vieille-Poste
Paris
Les Pavillons-sous-Bois
Périgny
Le Perreux-sur-Marne
Pierrefitte-sur-Seine
Le Plessis-Robinson
Le Plessis-Trévise
Le Pré-Saint-Gervais
Puteaux
La Queue-en-Brie
Le Raincy
Romainville
Rosny-sous-Bois
Rueil-Malmaison
Rungis
Saint-Cloud
Saint-Denis
Saint-Mandé
Saint-Maur-des-Fossés
Saint-Maurice
Saint-Ouen-sur-Seine
Santeny
Savigny-sur-Orge
Sceaux
Sevran
Sèvres
Stains
Sucy-en-Brie
Suresnes
Thiais
Tremblay-en-France
Valenton
Vanves
Vaucresson
Vaujours
Villecresnes
Ville-d'Avray
Villejuif
Villemomble
Villeneuve-la-Garenne
Villeneuve-le-Roi
Villeneuve-Saint-Georges
Villepinte
Villetaneuse
Villiers-sur-Marne
Vincennes
Viry-Châtillon
Vitry-sur-Seine

See also
Paris metropolitan area
Grand Paris Express
Île-de-France

Notes

References

Further reading
 Walter Wells, "Big Plans for Grand Paris," France Today (June 2009), Vol. 24 Issue 6, pp 10–12

External links 
Official Website 

Geography of Paris
Urban planning in France
Intercommunalities of Essonne
Intercommunalities of Hauts-de-Seine
Intercommunalities of Seine-Saint-Denis
Intercommunalities of Val-de-Marne
Intercommunalities of Val-d'Oise
Paris